Podolian cattle is a group of cattle breeds characterised by grey coats and upright and often long horns that are thought to have originated in the Podolian steppe.

Breeds in this group include:

 Podolian Grey Steppe breeds from Eastern Europe
 Hungarian Grey / Hungarian Steppe cattle (Hungary)
 Slavonian-Syrmian Podolian (Croatia)
 Srem Podolian / Serbian Podolian (Serbia)
 Sura de Stepă / Romanian Grey (Romania)
 Ukrainian Grey / Ukrainian Steppe Cattle (Ukraine)
 Podolian-Istrian breeds from Central Italy, Southern Italy and Istria (Croatia; Slovenia)
 Boškarin / Istrian cattle (Croatia; Slovenia)
 Maremmana (Italy)
 Podolica (Italy)
 Podolian-Illyrian breeds from the Balkans and Anatolia
 Boz Irk / Anatolian Grey (Turkey)
 Iskar Grey / Bulgarian Grey (Bulgaria)
 Katerini cattle (Greece)
 Sykia cattle (Greece)

External links
 A.N.A.B.I.C.: Sulle Tracce delle Podoliche. On the Tracks of Podolic Grey Cattle.

Cattle breeds